Alapont Group is a Spanish business group mainly dedicated to designing, manufacturing and installation of all types of engineering projects for lifting systems. Its headquarters are located in Alzira (Valencia). It also has offices in Madrid, Paris, Marseille, Toulouse, Alicante, Murcia, Castellón, Tarragona and distributors throughout the Spanish, French and Algerian territory.

History 

Alapont was founded as an electro-mechanical workshop in 1954 by Maria Bonet Matéu and Jose Alapont Bonet. In 1967, Alapont expands its activity thanks to their son, Jose Alapont Bonet, with the founding of the division of lifts and in 1987 it was established as a private limited company. Throughout 2009 Alapont carried out the purchase of patents and trade marks of Tornymark SA,  company specialized in manufacturing loading docks. In 2010, the group acquired the division of elevators and escalators of the French company CNIM, listed on the second market of the Paris Bourse. As a result of that, the agencies Toulouse, Marseille, Rennes and Paris are fully acquired. Then it is formed its new subsidiary, Alapont France, in order to strengthen in the escalators market.

References 
 "Blue Giant firma un acuerdo de colaboración con Alapont" Alapont Noticias. July 26, 2011.
 "El grupo Alapont amplía su expansión hacia Europa de Este y Latinoamérica"  Levante EMV. November 16, 2011.
 "Alapont compra una división de la francesa CNIM" Expansion. February 2, 2011.
 "Alapont consigue un contrato de tres millones para el metro de Toulouse" Las provincias. September 12, 2012.
 "Objetivo Luis Vuitton conseguido" Las provincias. October 10, 2012.
 "El metro de Marsella adjudica un contrato de cinco millones al grupo Alapont" Levante EMV. Juny 25, 2013.
 "Universidad Politécnica de Madrid y Alapont" Alapont Noticias. November 11, 2013.
 "La entrega de los premios al Grupo Alapont" Tus noticias de la ribera. February 21, 2014.
 "Información detallada de Grupo Alapont" Logismarket.

External links 

Technology companies established in 1954
Companies based in Valencia
Manufacturing companies established in 1954
Manufacturing companies of Spain
Elevator manufacturers
Escalator manufacturers
Spanish companies established in 1954